The National Alliance for Autism Research (NAAR), based in Princeton, New Jersey, was a non-profit advocacy organization, founded by parents of children with autism concerned about the limited funding available for research.

Origins and activities
NAAR was founded in 1994 as an attempt to stimulate biomedical research and science-based approaches to understanding, treating, and curing autism spectrum disorders. The founders comprised a small group of parents, including two psychiatrists, a lawyer, a CPA and a chemistry professor.

NAAR raised money to provide research grants focusing on autism, and has committed an excess of $20 million to over 200 autism research projects, fellowships and collaborative programs - more than any other non-governmental organization.  NAAR focused intently on its role in establishing and funding the Autism Tissue Program, a post-mortem brain tissue donation program designed to further autism research studies at the cellular and molecular level. Other major programs included the 'High Risk Baby Sibling Autism Research Project' and the 'NAAR Genome Project'. NAAR also published the NAARRATIVE, a newsletter on autism biomedical research. In early 2006, NAAR merged with Autism Speaks.

See also
 Interactive Autism Network

References

External links 
 PsychiatricTimes.com - 'A Psychiatrist's Journey from Parent to Founder of Research Advocacy Organization', Eric London, MD, Psychiatric Times, vol 14, no 11 (November, 1997)
 Neuroscience.Columbia.edu

Autism-related organizations in the United States
Mental health organizations in New Jersey
Non-profit organizations based in Princeton, New Jersey
Organizations established in 1994
1994 establishments in New Jersey